A. J. Arcuri (born August 13, 1997) is an American football offensive tackle for the Los Angeles Rams of the National Football League (NFL). He played college football at Michigan State and was drafted by the Rams in the seventh round of the 2022 NFL Draft.

Professional career
Arcuri was selected in the seventh round of the 2022 NFL Draft by the Los Angeles Rams with the 261st overall pick, the second-to-last selection of the draft. He was waived on August 30, 2022, and signed to the practice squad the next day. He was promoted to the active roster on November 26, 2022.

References

External links
 Los Angeles Rams bio
 Michigan State Spartans bio

Living people
1997 births
American football offensive tackles
Michigan State Spartans football players
Los Angeles Rams players
People from Powell, Ohio